Pcom or PCOM may refer to:
 Pcom Network, an Internet Service Provider based in Tehran Province, Iran
 P-Com, a defunct radio-networking manufacturer
 Pacific College of Oriental Medicine
 Philadelphia College of Osteopathic Medicine, in the United States
 Posterior communicating artery, a blood vessel in the brain often referred to as the 'p-com'
 Prison Commission (England and Wales)